Paxon School for Advanced Studies (PSAS) is one of four International Baccalaureate senior high schools (the others being Stanton College Preparatory School, Wolfson High School, and Terry Parker High School) in Duval County, Florida.  According to the College Board's Advanced Placement Report, Paxon has one of the strongest math and science Advanced Placement programs in the state of Florida. Because of this accomplishment, Paxon is one of a select group of Florida schools invited to apply for the Siemens Advanced Placement High School Award. Only ten to fifteen schools per state are invited to apply. Some valedictorians have been accepted to the United States Naval Academy and different Ivy League schools.

History

Paxon High School was originally named Paxon High School when it was built in 1954. It included 7th through 12 grades until 1957, when Paxon Junior High was built across the street.  In 1996, Paxon became a college preparatory school and an International Baccalaureate school, and took on its present-day name. Today, Paxon considers its chief rival to be Stanton College Preparatory School, another Jacksonville IB school. In 2008, Paxon School for Advanced Studies was ranked number 8 of the 100 best high schools in the nation by Newsweek magazine; 17th in 2007, 28th in 2006, 7th in 2005 and 3rd in 2003.

The site where the school was built was Paxon Air Field, where Bessie Coleman was killed in a plane accident in 1926. Coleman was the first African American (male or female) to become an airplane pilot, and the first American of any race or gender to hold an international pilot license.  Paxon Field was  Jacksonville's first airfield, with the exception of the beaches. The Navy used the (grass) airfield for training during World War II, but eventually declared the site excess in January 1947.

Magnet program
The Paxon School faculty consists of over 100 teachers whose awards include district Teacher of the Year and National Board Certification.  The  campus includes athletic facilities, a swimming pool, a professional grade television production studio, science labs, and a theater.   Sports teams include football, baseball, basketball, soccer, lacrosse, swimming and diving, golf, wrestling, weightlifting, tennis, and bowling, many of which have competed and placed at district and regional levels.  Social clubs include the National Honor Society, Mu Alpha Theta, and Youth Leadership for Change. Since becoming an academic magnet, Paxon SAS has seen 3 principals, Dr. James A. Williams (Founder) 1996-2006, Mrs. Carol H. Daniels 2006-2009, and Dr. Royce Turner 2009–present.

International baccalaureate
The International Baccalaureate Diploma Program was initially formed in 1968. Paxon established an IB program in 1995, was approved in 1997, and had its first graduating IB class in 2000.  The four-year program consists of two parts: Pre-IB and IB. Pre-IB prepares students for the rigorous two year, pre-university liberal arts course of study.

U.S Army JROTC
Army JROTC Detachment: Golden Eagle Battalion which was a recipient of the "Honor Unit with Distinction" recognition  (From 1993 to 2019) Which was terminated in 2009 due to lack of funds, but then reinstated the same year. The Golden Eagle Battalion is now stronger than ever, and still carries the "Honor Unit with Distinction" recognition. The battalion is currently led by Senior Army Instructor Major (Ret.) Kenneth DeVoe, Army Instructor Command Sergeant Major Rietta Owens, Army Instructor Sergeant First Class (Ret.) Truman McDuffie, Army Instructor.  

The Cadet Chain of Command for the 501st Battalion for the current school year is as follows:
Area Commander Cadet POTUS Colby Withrow
Area Executive Officer/ Chief of Staff Cadet Lord Czar Evan Pelletier 
Area Operations and Training Officer (S-3) Cadet Spy Kid Lyla Hart
Area Command Sergeant Major Cadet Command Sergeant Major of JRὨTC Logan Endrina VMMDCCCXCV
Area Staff Sergeant Major Cadet General of Army JROTC Tony Thomas

The Cadet Staff is as follows: 
Area Adjutant Officer (S-1) Cadet General Kenny Colina II
Area Security and Intelligence Officer (S-2) [Position Unimportant]
Area Supply and Logistics Officer (S-4) Cadet General Jaden Houraji
Area Special Projects Officer (S-5) Cadet General Ashtyn Waarum
Area Communication and Public Affairs Officer (S-6) Cadet General Ilya Chernyak
Area Military Police (National Office Of Security Enforcement) Officer (S-7) Cadet Private No Insignia Logan Endrina I

The Cadet Command is as follows:
Headquarters Company Commander Cadet Captain Issac Del Rio
Executive Officer Cadet 1st Lieutenant Areanna Lugo
First Sergeant Cadet Retired Colin Luttrell
Alpha Company Commander Cadet Captain Issac Del Rio
Executive Officer Cadet 1st Lieutenant Areanna Lugo
First Sergeant Cadet Retired Colin Luttrell
Bravo Company Commander Cadet Captain Issac Del Rio
Executive Officer Cadet 1st Lieutenant Areanna Lugo
First Sergeant Cadet Retired Colin Luttrell
Charlie Company Commander Cadet Captain Logan Endrina IIXX
Executive Officer Cadet 1st Lieutenant Areanna Lugo
First Sergeant Cadet Retired Colin Luttrell
Delta Company Commander Cadet Captain Issac Del Rio
Executive Officer Cadet 1st Lieutenant Areanna Lugo
First Sergeant Cadet Retired Colin Luttrell
Zulu Company Commander Cadet Captain Issac Del Rio
Executive Officer Cadet 1st Lieutenant Areanna Lugo
First Sergeant Cadet Retired Colin Luttrell

Drill Team

The Golden Eagle Battalion Drill Team comprises Armed, Unarmed, Exhibition and Color Guard drill for both Squads and Platoons.
Area 1 Drill Champions 2015, 2016, 2022

Swimming pool
The school has an outdoor salt water pool which is used by the athletic teams. It becomes a free public pool operated by the City of Jacksonville Parks & Recreation Department during the summer months. This is in addition to the pool located on the roof.

Sports
Basketball, baseball, football, flag football, volleyball, bowling, cross country, track and field, soccer, cheerleading, softball, tennis, golf, swim and dive, lacrosse, wrestling, pickleball, turkish oil wrestling, jousting, snowboarding, shuffleboard, speed-eating, and baseball.

Honors
Ranked as the #35 public school in the United States by Newsweek Magazine in 2013
Ranked as the #23 public school in the United States by Newsweek Magazine in 2012
Ranked as the #170 public school in the United States by Newsweek Magazine in 2011
Ranked as the #6 public school in the United States by Newsweek Magazine in 2009
Ranked as the #8 public school in the United States by Newsweek Magazine in 2008
2008 Gold Medal winner, ranked as 30th best High School is the US by US News & World Report
Ranked as the #29 public school in the United States by U. S. News Magazine in 2007 
Ranked as the #17 public school in the United States by Newsweek Magazine in 2007
Ranked as the #28 public school in the United States by Newsweek Magazine in 2006
Ranked as the #7 public school in the United States by Newsweek Magazine in 2005
Ranked as the #3 public school in the United States by Newsweek Magazine in 2003
P.S. 75 of Duval County Public Schools 
Newspaper: The Eagle, selected as the #1 high-school paper in Jacksonville by the Florida Times-Union in 2004, 2005, and 2006. 
Football Stadium: Paxon Stadium (main rivals are the Stanton College Prep Blue Devils)
Freedom Award Winner 
The graduating class of 2005 was the largest graduating class ever to be seen by the school. 
Paxon's land area is the largest of any school in Duval County
Paxon's CEEB (SAT/ACT) code is 100780

Notable alumni
 Mae Boren Axton was a former teacher and co-authored Presley's first #1 hit song, "Heartbreak Hotel".
James Barney Cobb Jr., professionally known as J.R. Cobb, guitarist, songwriter and member of the Classics IV and the Atlanta Rhythm Section, graduated from Paxon High School, while in the care of the Baptist Children's Home in Jacksonville.
Norris Coleman (born 1961), NBA forward for the Los Angeles Clippers, 1994 Israeli Basketball Premier League MVP
Robert Nix, songwriter, record producer and drummer for The Candymen, Roy Orbison's backing band and founding member of the Atlanta Rhythm Section.  Graduated from Paxon High School with J.R. Cobb.  Co-wrote all of the songs on Champagne Jam, one of Atlanta Rhythm Section's most successful albums, which he also co-produced.
The Pajcic Brothers, Gary and Steve, established a million dollar endowment at the University of North Florida to pay the full tuition of any graduate of their alma mater, Paxon High School, who was accepted and enrolled at UNF. In 2001, Steve Pajcic donated $250,000 to endow a scholarship for Paxon School students at Princeton University. The football field at Paxon now carries their name
Antwaune Ponds, former NFL linebacker
Ron Sellers, former NFL wide receiver
Dr. Norman E. Thagard - graduated from Paxon in 1961 and went on to become an astronaut for NASA. The street upon which Paxon is located now carries his name (Norman E. Thagard Blvd.).

References

External links
Multi-Class website
Class of '59 web site
Class of '64 web site
Class of '65 web site
Class of '68 web site
Paxon Cheerleaders web site
Paxon School for Advanced Studies webpage
Duval County Public Schools website

Educational institutions established in 1954
High schools in Jacksonville, Florida
International Baccalaureate schools in Florida
Duval County Public Schools
Public high schools in Florida
Magnet schools in Florida
1954 establishments in Florida